Stecchi is an Italian surname. Notable people with the surname include:

 Gianni Stecchi (born 1958), Italian pole vaulter
 Claudio Stecchi (born 1991), Italian pole vaulter

See also
 Stocchi

Italian-language surnames